Blue Amberol Records was the trademark for a type of cylinder recording manufactured by the Edison Records company in the U.S. from 1912 to 1929.  Made from a nitrocellulose compound developed at the Edison laboratory—though occasionally employing Bakelite in its stead and always employing an inner layer of plaster—these cylinder records were introduced for public sale in October 1912. The first release in the main, Popular series was number 1501, and the last, 5719, issued in October 1929 just as the Edison Records concern closed up shop. The Edison company also maintained separate issue number ranges for foreign, classical and special series that are not included here. The issue numbers are not necessarily continuous as some titles were not released, or otherwise skipped. Nevertheless, the Blue Amberol format was the longest-lived cylinder record series employed by the Edison Company. These were designed to be played on an Amberola, a type of Edison machine specially designed for celluloid records that did not play older wax cylinders. Blue Amberols are more commonly seen today than earlier Edison 2-minute brown or black wax and 4-minute black wax Amberol records.

The following very incomplete list of Blue Amberol Records is ranked by issue number, title, writer(s), performer(s) and date. Dates are certainly not chronological for either recording or issue; the issue of certain titles could be delayed or never deployed, and some Blue Amberol releases are merely reissues of earlier records that had appeared in other formats before the Blue Amberol existed. From about July 1914, Edison's Diamond Discs were used to master Blue Amberols and releases of the same titles appear in both series, though with totally different release numbers. Some of the very last Blue Amberols were dubbed from electrical recordings, though the Amberola was never manufactured with an electrical pickup; in later years, some enthusiasts have refitted Amberola players with electrical pickups and there is evidence that even at the end of the 1920s there were kits one could order to make the conversion.

Edison Blue Amberols 1501–2499

Edison Blue Amberols 2500-3499

Edison Blue Amberols 3500-4499

Edison Blue Amberols 4500-23059

See also 
 Blue Amberol Records

References

External links 
 Edison Blue Amberol cylinder recordings, from the UCSB Cylinder Audio Archive at the University of California, Santa Barbara Library.

 Blue Amberol Records
 American music-related lists